Harald Norpoth (born 22 August 1942) is a West German former middle and long distance runner. He won the silver medal over 5000 m at the 1964 Summer Olympics in Tokyo as a member of the United Team of Germany.  He had already competed in the 1962 European Athletics Championships, where he had fallen and dropped out of the 1500 m final.  His high quality as both a 1500 m and a 5000 m runner was proved in the 1966 European Athletics Championships, where he won the bronze medal at 1500 m and the silver medal at 5000 m.

At the 1968 Summer Olympics in Mexico Norpoth dropped out of the 5000 m and finished fourth over 1500 m. He also set a 2000 m world record  of 4:57.8 minutes in September 1966 in Hagen, Germany.  Norpoth remained an international-level 5000 m runner until his retirement from competitive running in 1973, as he finished third in the 1971 European Championships 5000 m final, losing by 1.2 seconds to the winner, Juha Väätäinen. At the 1972 Munich Summer Olympics, he finished sixth at 5000 m, losing by 6.2 seconds to the winner, Lasse Virén, and placing as the fourth best European.  In his farewell run at 5000 m in 1973, he set a personal record at 13:20.49.  Norpoth was known as a sharp kicker, although he also could endure a fast pace when he was in peak shape. He is a first cousin of political scientist Helmut Norpoth.

References

1942 births
Living people
Sportspeople from Münster
German male middle-distance runners
German male long-distance runners
Athletes (track and field) at the 1964 Summer Olympics
Athletes (track and field) at the 1968 Summer Olympics
Athletes (track and field) at the 1972 Summer Olympics
Olympic athletes of the United Team of Germany
Olympic athletes of West Germany
Olympic silver medalists for the United Team of Germany
European Athletics Championships medalists
Medalists at the 1964 Summer Olympics
Olympic silver medalists in athletics (track and field)